Saphenista allasia is a species of moth of the family Tortricidae. It is found in Ecuador in the provinces of Carchi and Napo.

References

Moths described in 1994
Saphenista